Arnold Leslie Jacobs, born on 12 November 1892 at Buenos Aires, Argentina and died on 9 August 1974, also at Buenos Aires, played international cricket for Argentina in non-first-class matches against Brazil and Chile in the 1920s and toured England with the 1932 South American team, when he appeared in two first-class games.

Jacobs was a lower order right-handed batsman and wicketkeeper. He first appeared in international matches against Chile in 1920 and 1921, when he did not keep wicket, and played in matches against Brazil up to 1927-28. He appeared in only two matches on the 1932 South American tour, when he made just 19 runs in three innings and took three catches. Including the minor games on the tour, he made only 71 runs in England and his highest score on the tour was 12.

References
 Wisden Cricketers' Almanack, 1933 edition, report on the South Americans' tour of England on pages 508 to 520
 Arnold Jacobs at CricketArchive.com

1892 births
1974 deaths
Argentine cricketers
Cricketers from Buenos Aires
South Americans cricketers
Argentine people of British descent
Wicket-keepers